Jonathan Ferguson (1915 – 1974)  was an electrical technician who worked as a scientific civil servant in the Ministries of Aircraft Production and Supply.  During the Second World War, he flew aircraft with the Air Transport Auxiliary.  In 1958, he had sex reassignment surgery.

Early life
Ferguson was born in Lurgan on 30 October 1915 to Edward and Jessie Ferguson, and was first educated at Lurgan High School and College. He then studied electrical engineering at technical colleges while working as a demonstrator for electricity boards in Northern Ireland and England. He then joined British Thomson-Houston to work on switchgear and, from there, became a technical assistant at the Ministry of Aircraft Production. Ferguson joined the Women's Engineering Society (WES) in 1940, joining the Council in 1947 and staying involved until the late 1950s. Ferguson represented WES on the Scholarship panel for the Amy Johnson Memorial Scholarship which was set up to support young women to further their flying careers.

Second World War
Ferguson had joined the Civil Air Guard and learnt to fly with them. In May 1943, he joined the Air Transport Auxiliary and flew warplanes for the RAF as a ferry pilot until October 1945, logging about a thousand flight hours. Ferguson reached the rank of Second Officer in the ATA and, after the war, was commissioned as a Pilot Officer in the Women's RAF Volunteer Reserve.

Personal life
In 1958, Ferguson announced that he had undergone sex reassignment surgery and his birth certificate had been updated so that he would henceforth be known as Jonathan Ferguson. He was then a Chief Experimental Officer in the Ministry of Supply, working on aircraft research and development and the change did not affect his position.

Later career 
In the mid 1960s, Jonathan Ferguson was in charge of a civilian group of around twenty ex-pilots who wrote and produced Aircrew Manuals, (previously known as Pilot's Notes) in conjunction with test establishment pilots and RAF staff. He referred to his life before transitioning as “when I wore a skirt”.

Jonathan Ferguson died in 1974 after falling from a domestic ladder.

References 

1915 births
1974 deaths
Air Transport Auxiliary pilots
British aviators
British women aviators
British women in World War II
Transgender men
Transgender military personnel

Women's Engineering Society
Transgender people from Northern Ireland